Katarzyna Helena Kowałeczko Henríquez (Santiago, 2 October 1964), better known as Katty Kowaleczko or Katty Ko, is a Chilean actress of Polish ancestry.

Artistic career 
Actress who started her career very young when she participated in various beauty pageants. Through participation in casting, debuted in a telenovela and then in 1987 got a role in the television series The Invitation. She participated fully in the dramatic productions Canal 13 and had a brief stint on TVN, which also became known for encouraging the children's program 'Arboliris. Return to Canal 13 to star in the TV series Marron Glacé and from there has not been detached from the Catholic station.

She has participated in successful theatrical productions such as The Vagina Monologues and has also been in some films. In 2004, she portrayed the role of a lover in the TV series Temptation, where she also shaved her head for her character that had cancer. InTelethon 2006, she did a striptease. She then worked on the docu-reality "Born To Win". Also participates in the great Chilean series of all time The 80.In June 2010 she announced that she left canal angel to migrate to Chilevisión and star in a dual role with the second night of the channel TV series to be called  Infiltradas''.

References

External links
 

1964 births
Living people
Actresses from Santiago
Chilean people of Polish descent
Chilean film actresses
Chilean stage actresses
Chilean telenovela actresses
Chilean television actresses